The Jacksonville mayoral election of 2007 took place on March 20, 2007. Incumbent Republican John Peyton was re-elected to second 4-year term, defeating the Democratic challenger and long time community activist Jackie Brown.

Candidates
 Republican John Peyton, incumbent Mayor, running for a second term.
 Democrat Jackie Brown, local political activist who started the Movement For Economic Justice to aid the Black community of Jacksonville.

Election results

References

2007 Florida elections
Government of Jacksonville, Florida
2007 United States mayoral elections
2007